Varja is a village in Lüganuse Parish, Ida-Viru County in northeastern Estonia.

See also
 Battle of Varja

References

Villages in Ida-Viru County
Lüganuse Parish